Ad Age (known as Advertising Age until 2017) is a global media brand that publishes news, analysis, and data on marketing and media. Its namesake magazine was started as a broadsheet newspaper in Chicago in 1930. Ad Age appears in multiple formats, including its website, daily email newsletters, social channels, events and a bimonthly print magazine.

Ad Age is based in New York City. Its parent company, the Detroit-based Crain Communications, is a privately held publishing company with more than 30 magazines, including Autoweek, Crain's New York Business, Crain's Chicago Business, Crain's Detroit Business, and Automotive News.

History
Advertising Age launched as a broadsheet newspaper in Chicago in 1930. Its first editor was Sid Bernstein.

The site AdCritic.com was acquired by The Ad Age Group in March 2002.

In 2007 Ad Age acquired the Thoddands Power 150, which is a top marketing blogs list.  

An industry trade magazine, BtoB, was folded into Advertising Age in January 2014.

In 2017, the magazine shortened its name to Ad Age.

Recognition
Ad Age, which The New York Times in 2014 called "the largest publication in the ad trade field" published in 1999 a list of the top 100 players in advertising history. Among these were Alvin Achenbaum, Bill Backer, Marion Harper Jr., Mary Wells Lawrence, ACNielsen, David Ogilvy, and J. Walter Thompson.

In 1980, Henderson Advertising, founded 1946 by James M. Henderson in Greenville, South Carolina, became the first agency outside New York or Chicago to be named Advertising Age's "Advertising Agency of the Year".

Creativity 50 
Since 2016, Ad Age has been running an annual award called Creativity 50 honoring the 50 most creative people in the advertising, marketing, technology and entertainment industries, in addition to top creative campaigns and the most innovative advertising. Past winners have also included entertainers such as Beyonce, David Bowie, Sia, Dwayne Johnson, James Corden, Donald Glover, Stephen Colbert and author Kelly Oxford.

Controversy
Thirty years after Ad Age's "Guns must go!" headline, on an editorial in response to the 1968 assassination of Robert F. Kennedy, the periodical's founder's eldest son wrote "Nothing Ad Age has done before or since has provoked a bigger response." There were "cancel my subscription" responses to what was described as "It is the first time I have ever seen Advertising Age step out of their field. ... What's more, it is not terribly becoming."

References

External links
 Advertising Age brand page on Crain Communications website

Business magazines published in the United States
Weekly magazines published in the United States
Magazines about advertising
Magazines established in 1930
Magazines published in Detroit